Colwellia beringensis is a Gram-negative, psychrophilic, rod-shaped and motile bacterium from the genus of Colwellia which has been isolated from sediments from the Bering Sea.

References

Alteromonadales
Bacteria described in 2017